Zoran Petrović (Serbian Cyrillic: Зоран Петровић; 5 March 1954 — 25 February 2018) was a Serbian poet, novelist, and screenwriter.

He published a couple of poetry books, children books, novels, and two books as a publicist. He was the managing director of the oldest theater in Serbia Joakim Vujić.

In the years prior to his death, he worked as an editor for the publishing sector of the museum 21 October and as the chief editor for culture in local weekly newspaper Svetlost. He was also a columnist of Serbian newspaper Blic.

Works

Poetry
 Pan i ogledalo, (1978)
 Aleksandrijska kritična masa, (1989)
 Svakodnevna molitva, (1995)
 Apsolutna nula, (1996)
 Spasiti spasioca, (1998)
 Prisutni su odsutni, (2002)
 Stav u trostavu, (2009)
 Uputstva za korišćenje besmislica (u štampi)
 Popis nestalih stvari (u štampi)
 Običnim rečima rečeno (u pripremi)

Children poetry books
 Priča o slovima, (1978)
 Pesme iz trbuha, (1983)

Theater Screenplays
 Muvoserine

Screenplay for children theater
 Magareća koža

Short story – books
 Raspadanje dekadnog sistema, (2010)

Opinion journalism
 Tajni dosije Josip Broz (Neobjavljeni arhivi Barskog kongresa)
 Vreme laži (knjiga razgovora sa Dankom Popovićem)

Novels
 Kamen blizanac, (2010)
 Poslednja narudžbina, (2010)
 Ugarak, (2011)

Awards
Miloš Crnjanski, 2011,

References

1954 births
2018 deaths
Writers from Kragujevac
Serbian novelists
Serbian dramatists and playwrights
Serbian non-fiction writers
Serbian male poets
Serbian male short story writers
Male non-fiction writers